was a Japanese poet of the Taishō period, a member of the Araragi school of tanka, and a psychiatrist.

The psychiatrist Shigeta Saitō (Japanese Wikipedia article) is his first son, the novelist Morio Kita is his second son and the essayist Yuka Saitō is his granddaughter.

Mokichi was born in the village of Kanakame, now part of Kaminoyama, Yamagata in 1882. He attended Tokyo Imperial University Medical School and, upon graduation in 1911, joined the staff of Sugamo Hospital where he began his study of psychiatry. He later directed Aoyama Hospital, a psychiatric facility.

Mokichi studied tanka under Itō Sachio, a disciple of Masaoka Shiki and leader, after his master's death, of the Negishi Tanka Society; Sachio also edited the society's official  journal Ashibi. This magazine, due to Sachio's increasing commitment to other literary activities, was subsequently replaced by Araragi in 1908. The publication in 1913 of Mokichi's first collection of tanka, Shakkō ("Red Light") was an immediate sensation with the broader public. The first edition collected the poet's work from the years 1905-1913 and included 50 tanka sequences (rensaku), with the autobiographical  being perhaps the most celebrated sequence in the book.

Mokichi's career as a poet spanned almost 50 years. At the time of his death at the age of 70, he had published seventeen poetry collections which include “14,200 or so poems,” the collected works being overwhelmingly devoted to tanka. In 1950 he received the inaugural Yomiuri Prize for poetry. He received the Order of Culture in 1951.

Mokichi was the family doctor of author Ryūnosuke Akutagawa and may have unknowingly played an indirect role in the latter's suicide. He also wrote philological essays on waka of Kakinomoto no Hitomaro and of Minamoto no Sanetomo.

Notes

References

Heinrich, Amy Vladeck, 1983. Fragments of Rainbows: The Life and Poetry of Saitō Mokichi. New York: Columbia University Press. .
Keene, Donald, 1999. Dawn to the West: A History of Japanese Literature, Volume 4 - Japanese Literature of the Modern Era (Poetry, Drama, Criticism). New York: Columbia University Press. .
Shinoda, Seishi and Sanford Goldstein, eds., 1989. Red Lights: Selected Tanka Sequences from Shakkō by Mokichi Saitō. West Lafayette: Purdue University Press. .

1882 births
1953 deaths
Japanese psychiatrists
People associated with the Department of Neuropsychiatry University of Tokyo
University of Tokyo alumni
People from Yamagata Prefecture
20th-century Japanese poets
Yomiuri Prize winners